"Isoptericola salitolerans" is a halotolerant, Gram-positive, aerobic and non-motile bacterium from the genus Isoptericola which has been isolated from a salt lake in China.

References 

Micrococcales
Bacteria described in 2013